Marcello Ribeiro (born 7 November 1981), known as Marcello Matrone, is a footballer.

He previously played for Finnish club FC Hämeenlinna.

References

External links
 
 

1981 births
Living people
Brazilian footballers
Brazilian expatriate footballers
Veikkausliiga players
Hassania Agadir players
FC Hämeenlinna players
Expatriate footballers in Morocco
Expatriate footballers in Finland
Association Salé players
Association football midfielders
Association football forwards
Sportspeople from Goiás